A guige (/ɡiːʒ/, /ɡiːd͡ʒ/) is a long strap, typically made of leather, used to hang a shield on the shoulder or neck when not in use. Used in combat, it freed a soldier to use a weapon requiring two hands without discarding the shield; the shield could then be easily retrieved when needed.

Some guiges had a buckle to adjust the length. A guige could be attached to the shield anywhere along its rim, and could run horizontally, vertically, or diagonally across the diameter of the shield.

Most information about the usage of guiges comes from various Medieval works of art, such as the Bayeux Tapestry. Frequently in heraldry shields are depicted hanging from guige straps.

See also 
 Enarmes

References

Medieval shields